The Break ("The Truce") is a French-language Belgian crime drama television series, produced by Anthony Rey and directed by Matthieu Donck. It debuted on RTBF's La Une on 21 February 2016, on France 2 on 29 August 2016, and on Netflix in the United States, United Kingdom and Canada on 21 December 2016.

Season 2 premiered in Belgium on 11 November 2018. On 9 February 2019, it was released on Netflix in the United States and many other countries.

Synopsis

Season 1 
Police detective Yoann Peeters moves from Brussels with his daughter, Camille, to his home town, where the body of a young African football player was pulled from the river. The death is originally thought to be a suicide, but Peeters suspects murder. In addition, there is corruption associated with gaining approval by farmers to sell their land to allow construction of a dam and reservoir.

Season 2 
Jasmina Orban, the psychiatrist calls back Yoann Peeters to help her prove the innocence of one of her patients, Dany Bastin. Dany, a former convict, was working as a gardener for wealthy owner Astrid du Tilleul, who was found murdered in the swimming pool of her house.

Cast

Main 
Yoann Blanc as Detective Yoann Peeters
Jasmina Douieb as Jasmina Orban, the psychiatrist
Guillaume Kerbush as police inspector Sébastian Drummer
Tom Audenaert as René Verselt
Lara Hubinont as Marjorie
Jean-Henri Compère as Rudy Geeraerts
Sophie Breyer as Camille Peeters, Yoann's daughter
Sophie Maréchal as Zoé Fischer

Season 1 
Jérémy Zagba as Driss Assani, football player
Anne Coesens as Inès Buisson
Catherine Salée as Brigitte Fischer
Thomas Mustin as Kevin Fischer
Vincent Grass as Lucien Rabet
Jean-Benoît Ugeux as Markus

Season 2 
Aurélien Caeyman as Dany Bastin, the suspect
Valérie Bauchau as Astrid du Tilleul, the victim
Karim Barras as Karim Briquet
Anne-Cécile Vandalem as Claudine, Astrid's sister
Vincent Lecuyer as Tino, Claudine's husband
Achille Ridolfi as the lawyer

Episodes

Series 1 (2016)

Series 2 (2018)

Production
La Trêve is produced by Helicotronc, in co-production with RTBF and Proximus. It received €1.18 million ($1.5 million) from the new Wallonie Brussels Federation-RTBF Fund for Belgian Series and the Wallimage Bruxellimage regional economic fund. The series is filmed in the Ardennes. It is the first French-language Belgian television crime drama.

Release
La Trêve premiered on 21 February 2016 RTBF's La Une, and received an average audience share of 22.5%.

Music
Belgian band Balthazar's song "The Man Who Owns The Place" plays during the opening credits of each episode of the first season.

The original score composed by Eloi Ragot is available on digital platforms.

International distribution
 (Flemish): Canvas – 8 October 2016
: France 2 – 29 August 2016
: RTS – 22 June 2016
 /  / : Netflix – 21 December 2016

References

External links 

2016 Belgian television series debuts
French-language television programming in Belgium
Television shows set in Belgium
Serial drama television series
Police procedural television series
Neo-noir television series
French-language Netflix original programming
Belgian crime television series
La Une original programming